Greg Demos is an American musician and lawyer from Dayton, Ohio best known as a long time bassist for Guided by Voices. By trade, he is a partner in the law firm of Fowler, Demos & Stueve in Lebanon, Ohio.  Demos has also performed with The New Creatures and 3 Dream Bag.

Discography

With the New Creatures 
 Pedomasoma and Crawl [Cassette EP]
 Walk and Roll [Cassette EP]
 1984:	Media Brainwash
 1987:	Rafter Tag 
 1988:	Good Ol' Days [7" Single] 
 2004:	Penelope Flowers [collection of previously unreleased material]

With 3 Dream Bag 
 1993:	A Frenzy in Frownland [EP]
 1995: Bevil Web/3 Dream Bag [Split EP]
 2001:	The Fertile Octogenarian
 2007:	Memory Garden

With Guided by Voices 
 1990: Same Place the Fly Got Smashed
 1992:	Propeller
 1994:	Bee Thousand
 1994:	I Am a Scientist [EP] 
 1995:	Alien Lanes
 1995:	Box [Box Set]
 1999:	Do the Collapse
 2000:	Hold On Hope [EP]
 2000:	Suitcase: Failed Experiments and Trashed Aircraft [Box Set] 
 2000:	Briefcase (Suitcase Abridged: Drinks and Deliveries) 
 2001:	Daredevil Stamp Collector: Do The Collapse B-sides [EP]
 2001:	The Who Went Home And Cried [DVD] (Documents the night of Demos' final Guided by Voices show)
 2002:	Some Drinking Implied  [DVD]
 2003:	Hardcore UFOs: Revelations, Epiphanies and Fast Food in the Western Hemisphere [Box Set] 
 2005:	Suitcase 2: American Superdream Wow [Box Set] 
 2005:	Briefcase 2 (Suitcase 2 Abridged - The Return of Milko Waif)
 2005:	The Electrifying Conclusion [DVD]
 2012: Let's Go Eat the Factory
 2012: Class Clown Spots a UFO
 2012: The Bears for Lunch
 2013: English Little League
 2014: Motivational Jumpsuit
 2014: Cool Planet

With Robert Pollard/Fading Captain Series 
 1999:	Kid Marine (Robert Pollard)
 2001:	Choreographed Man of War (Robert Pollard & His Soft Rock Renegades) 
 2003:	Motel of Fools (Robert Pollard)
 2005:	Lightninghead to Coffeepot (Moping Swans)
 2007:	Crickets: Best of the Fading Captain Series 1999–2007

References

Ohio lawyers
Guitarists from Ohio
Living people
Year of birth missing (living people)
Place of birth missing (living people)
American rock bass guitarists
Guided by Voices members
American male bass guitarists
Musicians from Dayton, Ohio